Blepephaeus borneensis is a species of beetle in the family Cerambycidae. It was described by Stephan von Breuning in 1944. It is known from Borneo.

References

Blepephaeus
Beetles described in 1944